Castlehaven Gaelic Football Club is a Cork GAA club in the parish of Castlehaven near the town of Skibbereen, County Cork, Ireland. The club also draws players from the villages of Union Hall, Castletownshend and Tragumna. The club participates in competitions run by Cork GAA and by the Carbery divisional board. The club is primarily concerned with the game of Gaelic football, but has fielded hurling teams in the past. They went from playing at Junior B level in 1969 to reaching the Cork Senior Football Championship final only 10 years later. The club has remained at senior level ever since, even though it draws from a very small pool of players.

Football

Honours

Munster Senior Club Football Championships: 3
 1989, 1994, 1997
Cork Senior Football Championships: 5
 1989, 1994, 2003, 2012, 2013
 Runner-Up 1979, 1997, 2011, 2015
 Kelleher Shield (Senior Football League) 3
 1993, 1998, 2007
Cork Intermediate Football Championship 1
 1978  Runners-Up 1977
Cork Junior Football Championship 1
 1976
West Cork Junior A Football Championship 2
 1973, 1976
West Cork Junior B Football Championship 2
 1944, 1969
West Cork Junior C Football Championship 1
 2003
Cork Under-21 Football Championship 5
 1981, 1983, 1998, 2007, 2010
West Cork Under-21 A Football Championship 7
 1980, 1981, 1982, 1983, 1998, 2007, 2010  Beaten finalists 1972, 1975, 1976, 1977, 1979, 1984, 1987, 1996, 2002, 2008, 2012, 2013, 2014, 2020
Cork Minor A Football Championship 1
 2013, Runners-Up 2004
West Cork Minor A Football Championship 3
 2001, 2004, 2013 Runner-Up 2005
West Cork Minor B Football Championship 6
 1971, 1977, 1978, 1980, 1982, 1986  Beaten finalists 1974, 1983, 1987
West Cork Minor C Football Championship 1
 2012

Hurling

Honours
West Cork Junior B Hurling Championship 2
 1973, 1980  Runner-Up 1978
West Cork Under-21 B Hurling Championship 1
 1981

Notable players
 Michael Burns
 Damien Cahalane
 Niall Cahalane
 John Cleary
 Ned Cleary
 Donie Collins
 Mark Collins
 Brian Hurley
 Michael Maguire
 Larry Tompkins

References

External links
Official Castlehaven GAA Club website
Munster Club Teams

Gaelic games clubs in County Cork
Gaelic football clubs in County Cork
Hurling clubs in County Cork